The Battle of Ewloe (also known as the Battle of Coleshill) was a battle fought in July 1157 between a large army led by Henry II of England and an army led by the Welsh prince Owain Gwynedd. The location was  marked with a plaque to commemorate 850 years since the battle.

Background 
King Henry (who ascended to the throne in 1154) decided to invade Gwynedd to halt the recent expansion of Owain Gwynedd into the lands of Powys, and to expand his empire into northern Wales. With the support of the Prince of Powys Madog ap Maredudd and Owain's brother Cadwaladr ap Gruffydd (whom Owain had recently stripped of his lands in Ceredigion), Henry led an army consisting of one-third of the knights in England and an unknown number of infantry into northern Wales and sent a fleet (led by Henry FitzRoy) to capture Anglesey to cut off Owain's supplies.

The battle 
Owain's army made camp at Basingwerk to block the route to Twthill at Rhuddlan. Henry split from his main army with a smaller force that would march through the nearby Ewloe woods (in modern-day Flintshire) to outflank Owain's army. Sensing this, Owain is said to have sent a large army led by his sons Dafydd ab Owain Gwynedd and Cynan ab Owain Gwynedd into the woods to guard Owain's main force from Henry's outflanking army. Owain split his army and decided to personally lead an extra 200 men into the Ewloe woods to reinforce his sons. When Henry's outflanking force advanced into the wood, they were ambushed by Owain's forces and cut down. The remainder of Henry's force retreated, with Henry narrowly avoiding being killed himself (having been rescued by Roger, Earl of Hertford).

Aftermath 
Henry managed to escape back to his main army alive. Not wishing to engage the Angevin army directly, Owain repositioned himself first at St. Asaph, then further west, clearing the road for Henry II to enter into Rhuddlan "ingloriously". Once in Rhuddlan, Henry II received word that his naval expedition had failed. Instead of meeting Henry II at Deganwy or Rhuddlan as the king had commanded, the English fleet had gone to plunder Môn and the Norman troops on board had been defeated by the local Welsh soldiers (Henry FitzRoy himself had also been killed). Despite Owain's success in the Ewloe woods and the success of his men on Anglesey, Henry had still succeeded in securing Rhuddlan, and so Owain felt obliged to make peace with him. Owain surrendered the lands of Rhuddlan and Tegeingl to Chester. He also gave Cadwaladr his lands back in Ceredigion, which re-cemented the alliance between the two brothers. Owain also agreed to render homage and fealty to Henry. Henry II had achieved the objective of his campaign with Owain’s forced submission.

References

Sources 

  

Ewloe 1157
Ewloe 1157
Ewloe
Henry II of England
1157 in England
History of Cheshire